Fahed Al-Mobarak was a football player for Al-Hilal in the Saudi Premier League.

References

1984 births
Living people
Al Hilal SFC players
Al-Faisaly FC players
Ettifaq FC players
Al-Shoulla FC players
Saudi Arabian footballers
Saudi Professional League players
Association football midfielders